Michael Francis Dukes (March 16, 1936 – June 16, 2008) was an American collegiate and professional football player who was best known as a linebacker for the original Houston Oilers. Born in Louisville, Kentucky, Dukes attended Southwest DeKalb High School in Decatur, Georgia and then played in college for Clemson University. He then played the 1959 season for the San Francisco 49ers of the National Football League. Dukes left the NFL for the upstart American Football League where he played eleven seasons for the Oilers, Boston Patriots and New York Jets. He played for the first two championship teams of the American Football League, the 1960 and 1961 Oilers, and was selected to the UPI All-AFL Team in 1961.

Dukes died in an automobile accident on Interstate 10 in Beaumont, Texas on June 16, 2008, at age 72.

His interment was at Oak Bluff Memorial Park in Port Neches.

See also

 List of American Football League players

References

External links
 

1936 births
2008 deaths
American football linebackers
Clemson Tigers football players
Boston Patriots players
Houston Oilers players
New York Jets players
San Francisco 49ers players
People from Decatur, Georgia
Players of American football from Louisville, Kentucky
Road incident deaths in Texas
American Football League players